Edward John O'Donohue (born 1 May 1974) is a former member of the Victorian Legislative Council for the Liberal Party. O'Donohue was elected to the Eastern Victoria Region at the 2006 election.

From 22 April 2013 until its defeat at the 2014 state election, O'Donohue served in the Napthine Ministry as Minister for Liquor and Gaming Regulation, Minister for Corrections, and Minister for Crime Prevention. He replaced Andrew McIntosh, who had resigned from the cabinet on 16 April.

Whilst in opposition, O'Donohue served as Shadow Attorney-General and, in that role, provided commentary on the Nicola Gobbo matter.

In August 2021, O'Donohue made comments on Twitter which were widely criticised as inappropriate, equating the takeover of Afghanistan by the Taliban with the state government's response to the COVID-19 pandemic.

In September 2021, after a discussion with the Liberal Party’s new parliamentary leader Matthew Guy, O'Donohue announced that he would resign from Victorian politics, and did so on 1 December 2021.

References

External links
 Official website
 First speech
 Parliamentary voting record of Edward O'Donohue at Victorian Parliament Tracker

|-

1974 births
Living people
Members of the Victorian Legislative Council
Liberal Party of Australia members of the Parliament of Victoria
21st-century Australian politicians